The Woman in White is a 1917 American drama film directed by Ernest C. Warde and starring Florence La Badie, Richard R. Neill, and Gertrude Dallas. It comprises five reels of 4,627 feet and had its premiere on July 1, 1917. Length: 1 hour 8 minutes. The film was originally distributed by Pathé. In the 1920s it was re-released under the title The Unfortunate Marriage.

Plot
As described in a film magazine review, Laura Fairlie (Florence La Badie) marries Sir Pervival Glyde (Richard R. Neill) as a result of her father's last request. Shortly after her marriage, Ann Catherick (also played by Florence La Badie), known as the "woman in white" and who resembles Laura, comes to Laura and tells her of Glyde's past, making Laura unhappy. Marian (Gertrude Dallas), Laura's half sister, learns from Laura the true state of affairs and decides to keep an eye on Sir Pervival. Through the efforts of Marian, Laura is saved from an unhappy fate.

Cast 
 Florence La Badie - double role as Laura Fairlie and Ann Catherick
 Richard R. Neill - Sir Pervival Glyde
 Gertrude Dallas - Marian Holcombe
  - Count Fosco
 Wayne Arey - Walter Hartridge
 J.H. Gilmour
 Claude Cooper

Reception
Like many American films of the time, The Woman in White was subject to cuts by city and state film censorship boards. The Chicago Board of Censors required the cutting of two intertitles, "Patience, my friend, something tells me your wife will not enjoy good health here" and "Yes, my friend, the crazy woman is critically ill - she will not trouble you long."

Survival status
Prints of the film exist in the Library of Congress film archive.

References

External links
 
 

1917 films
1917 drama films
Films based on works by Wilkie Collins
Silent American drama films
Articles containing video clips
American black-and-white films
American silent feature films
Films based on British novels
Pathé Exchange films
Films set in England
Films directed by Ernest C. Warde
1910s English-language films
1910s American films